John Matthias Wilson (b South Shields 15 June 1814 – d Oxford 1 December 1881) was an Oxford college head in the 19th century.

Wilson matriculated at Corpus Christi College, Oxford in 1832, graduating B.A. in 1836, M.A. in 1839, and B.D. in 1847. A philosopher, he was Fellow of Corpus from 1849 to 1869; White's Professor of Moral Philosophy at the university from 1846 to 1874; and President of Corpus from 1872 until his death.

References

1814 births
1881 deaths
Alumni of Corpus Christi College, Oxford
Fellows of Corpus Christi College, Oxford
Presidents of Corpus Christi College, Oxford
People from South Shields
White's Professors of Moral Philosophy